Newton Diehl Baker Jr. (December 3, 1871 – December 25, 1937) was an American lawyer, Georgist, politician, and government official. He served as the 37th mayor of Cleveland, Ohio from 1912 to 1915. As U.S. Secretary of War from 1916 to 1921, Baker presided over the United States Army during World War I.

Born in Martinsburg, West Virginia, Baker established a legal practice in Cleveland after graduating from Washington and Lee University School of Law. He became a progressive Democratic ally of Mayor Tom L. Johnson. Baker served as city solicitor of Cleveland from 1901 to 1909 before taking office as mayor in 1912. As mayor, he sought public transit reform, hospital improvement, and city beautification. Baker supported Woodrow Wilson at the 1912 Democratic National Convention, helping Wilson win the votes of the Ohio delegation. After leaving office, Baker accepted appointment as Secretary of War under President Wilson. He was one of several prominent Georgists appointed to positions in the Wilson Cabinet.

Baker presided over the U.S. military's participation in World War I. He selected General John J. Pershing to command the American Expeditionary Forces, which he insisted act as an independent unit. He left office in 1921 and returned to BakerHostetler, the legal practice he co-founded. He served as an attorney in Village of Euclid v. Ambler Realty Co., a landmark case that established the constitutionality of zoning laws. He was a strong supporter of the League of Nations and continued to advocate American participation in the League during the 1920s. Beginning in 1928, he served as a member of the Permanent Court of Arbitration. He was a candidate for the presidential nomination at the 1932 Democratic National Convention, but the convention chose Franklin D. Roosevelt.

Early years
Newton Diehl Baker was born on December 3, 1871, in Martinsburg, West Virginia, the son of Newton Diehl Baker Sr. and Mary Ann (Dukehart) Baker. Baker's grandfather, Elias Baker, was a staunch unionist, his father, on the contrary, joined the Confederate Army, served as a cavalryman, was wounded, and became a northern prisoner of war. After returning home in 1865, he obtained a medical degree from the University of Maryland Medical School and worked as a physician in Martinsburg until his death in 1906.

Baker attended the village schools in Martinsburg through his second year in high school and finished his preparatory training at Episcopal High School in Alexandria, Virginia.

In 1892, Baker graduated with bachelor's degree from Johns Hopkins University, where he was a member of Phi Gamma Delta fraternity. He attended lectures of Woodrow Wilson, who was a visiting professor at the time. After receiving his law degree from Washington and Lee University School of Law in 1894, he tried for a year to establish law practice in Martinsburg, and then became private secretary to Postmaster General William L. Wilson, who served in the Confederate cavalry with Baker's father. He stayed in Washington, D.C. until June 1897, then took a vacation in Europe, and returned to Martinsburg. In January 1899, he became a junior partner at Foran, McTigne and Baker in Cleveland.

Baker was small and thin. He was rejected for military service in the Spanish–American War because of poor eyesight.

Cleveland politics
When Baker moved to Cleveland, his political sympathies belonged to the Democratic Party; he supported the so-called Gold Democrats and their platform of gold standard, free trade, and civil service reform. He built a successful legal career and became involved in local politics. He helped the Democratic candidate Tom L. Johnson to become the mayor of Cleveland, and under his mentorship started his own public career. Johnson was a passionate advocate of Georgist political progressivism. Baker became exposed to Johnson's politics and also became a Georgist. He assisted Johnson in his fights against city's utility monopolies, e.g., Cleveland Electric Railway Company owned by Mark Hanna, which made Baker popular among Clevelanders.

After serving as city solicitor from 1901 to 1909, he became mayor of the city in 1911. As a city official, Baker's main interests were providing Cleveland with electricity (he built a municipal light plant), public transit reform, hospital improvement, and city beautification. He was a strong backer of Cleveland College, now a part of Case Western Reserve University. His crowning achievement as a mayor was the passage of the home rule amendment to Ohio's constitution, which was approved by voters in 1912. It granted Cleveland a right to draw its own charter and conduct the city business without state interference.

When Baker worked on Wilson's behalf at the Democratic National Convention in Baltimore in 1912, he was considered as a possible vice-presidential contender. He and Wilson had been acquaintances since they were both at Johns Hopkins in the 1890s, and Baker played a vital role during Wilson's Democratic nomination for president at the convention by securing votes from Ohio delegates. Wilson wanted to bring him to Washington D.C. Though offered the post twice, Baker declined to serve as United States Secretary of the Interior during President Wilson's first term.

A 1993 survey of historians, political scientists and urban experts conducted by Melvin G. Holli of the University of Illinois at Chicago ranked Baker as the eigteenth-best American big-city mayor to have served between the years 1820 and 1993. 

In 1916, following his tenure as mayor of Cleveland, Baker and two other partners founded the law firm of BakerHostetler.

Secretary of War

As the United States considered whether to enter World War I, President Woodrow Wilson had named Baker Secretary of War on 9 March 1916, because Baker was acceptable to advocates and opponents of American participation in the conflict. The post also required legal expertise because of the War Department's role in administering the Philippines, the Panama Canal, and Puerto Rico. The New York Times called him a "warm supporter" of the President. At 44, he was the youngest member of the Cabinet. The American entry into World War I occurred in April 1917.

One historian described his relationship to the military:

As Secretary of War, Baker presided over the American military participation in the First World War in 1917 and 1918, including the creation of a nationwide military draft. Baker selected Gen. John J. Pershing to head the American Expeditionary Forces. At Baker's insistence, Wilson made the American forces an independent fighting partner of the Allies against the Central Powers, rather than letting American troops be used to replenish British and French forces as those nations advised. At one meeting with British Prime Minister, David Lloyd George, Baker told him that "if we want advice as to who should command our armies, we would ask for it. But until then we do not want nor need it from anyone, least of all you."

On December 15, 1917, a War Council was formed (as distinct from the Council of National Defense) consisting of the Secretary of War, his Assistant, the Chief of Staff of the United States Army, the Quartermaster General of the United States Army, the Chief of Ordnance and possibly others. The War Council was to oversee and coordinate all matters of supply and to plan for the effective use of the military power of the nation. Baker had inherited a supply chain problem of gargantuan proportions although at first in April the administration knew nothing of its scale. Problems began quickly to crop up and on 18 December, three days after its formation, Baker fired three of the five officers appointed to the War Council. He appointed George Washington Goethals as Quartermaster General on that day.

He was occasionally attacked by military professionals who thought him incompetent or a pacifist at heart. He said, "I'm so much of a pacifist, I'm willing to fight for it."

In 1917, Baker was elected an honorary member of the Virginia Society of the Cincinnati..

In 1918, Wilson told Baker that he hoped he would follow him into the White House in 1920..

Emmett Jay Scott served as Baker's Special Advisor of Black Affairs.

Later years
After stepping down as Secretary of War in 1921, Baker returned to practicing law at Baker & Hostetler.

For several years he was the leading proponent of American participation in the League of Nations.

In 1922, the Encyclopædia Britannica published a brief account of Baker's life that drew sharp criticism. It said, in part, "The charge of pacifism was often brought against him and his career generally as Secretary was widely condemned throughout the United States." Among the prominent names who called the Encyclopedia to account were Livingston Farrand of Cornell and Ernest M. Hopkins of Dartmouth.

At the 1924 Democratic National Convention, during discussion of the party platform, Baker was the principal advocate of language committing the party to American membership in the League of Nations. After losing in the platform committee, which advocated a national referendum on the question, he raised the issue on the floor of the convention.

Though he had no chance of winning over the delegates to support his position, he delivered a speech that was the highlight of the convention, "political oratory at its peak" according to an exhaustive account of the convention: "According to reporters, men and women everywhere burst into tears. It was a tour de force, emotional and bordering on hysteria." He drew upon memories of Wilson, who had died just five months earlier and pleaded for a return to Wilsonian idealism:

When his allotted 20 minutes expired, the crowd roared for him to continue. After an hour he left the lectern to a tremendous ovation. Speakers who tried to argue against him were booed. Yet the final vote went against him by a margin of more than 2 to 1. According to a New York Times editorial,

For a moment that vast audience was lifted from partisan thoughts to heights from which it could have a glimpse of the promised land of peace. ... Not only did Mr. Baker do his best, but he made one of the best and most moving speeches heard of late in any political meeting. He showed himself a disciple worthy to wear his master's mantle. He too has the spirit of prophecy upon him.

Later at the convention, he nominated former Governor James M. Cox of Ohio as his state's "favorite son."

In 1928, President Coolidge appointed Baker a member of the Permanent Court of Arbitration of The Hague, and he was reappointed to another six-year term by Roosevelt in 1935.  In 1929, President Herbert Hoover appointed Baker to the Wickersham Commission on issues relating to law enforcement, criminal activity, police brutality, and Prohibition.

He remained active in Democratic Party affairs and was considered as a serious prospect for the Democratic nomination for President in 1932, when he declined to announce his candidacy but worked behind the scenes in the hope of being chosen if Franklin D. Roosevelt failed to win the nomination.

Yale University awarded him an honorary Doctor of Laws in 1932.

Baker argued before the U.S. Supreme Court as counsel for the property owner in Village of Euclid v. Ambler Realty Co., a landmark case that established the constitutionality of zoning laws.

Baker served on the Board of Trustees of Johns Hopkins University beginning in 1918 and was considered for appointment as president of the institution in 1928.

In 1936, he resigned as a member of the Cuyahoga County Democratic Committee after serving for 26 years.

He published a lecture in pamphlet form as War in the Modern World in 1935.

Personal life

Baker married Elizabeth Wells Leopold, a faculty member at Wilson College, on July 5, 1902. They had two daughters (Margaret and Elizabeth) and a son, Newton D. Baker III, all of whom survived him, as did five grandchildren.

Confined to his bed after December 3, 1937, because of a longstanding heart condition, Baker died of a cerebral hemorrhage in Shaker Heights, Ohio, on Christmas Day, December 25, 1937. After lying in state with full military honors at Trinity Cathedral and a simple funeral at the family's request, Baker was buried in Lake View Cemetery. His wife died on August 24, 1951.

Legacy
During World War II the Liberty ship  was built in Panama City, Florida, and named in his honor.

In 1957 Western Reserve University, now Case Western Reserve, erected the Newton D. Baker Building in his honor. Located on the corner of Adelbert and Euclid, across from Severance Hall, it served as a large unit of general purpose classrooms and administrative offices. The building was torn down in November 2004.

The Georgetown mansion Baker occupied while Secretary of War, now known as Newton D. Baker House, is on the National Register of Historic Places.

The law firm he founded, Baker Hostetler, is one of the nation's 100 largest firms.

Baker High School and Newton D. Baker School of Arts located on W. 159th Street in West Park, Cleveland are both named after Baker. A dormitory at Ohio State University, dedicated in 1940, is named Baker Hall (see information about the building) in his honor. The Newton D. Baker dormitory at Washington and Lee University is also named for him. The Veterans Administration Hospital in his hometown of Martinsburg WV was originally named the Newton D. Baker Hospital and is still referred to as such by local residents.

References

Further reading
 Beaver, Daniel R. "Newton D. Baker and the Genesis of the War Industries Board, 1917-1918." Journal of American History (1965) 52#1 pp: 43–58. in JSTOR
 Beaver, Daniel R. Newton D. Baker and the American War Effort, 1917-1919 (University of Nebraska Press, 1966)
 Craig, Douglas B.  Progressives at War: William G. McAdoo and Newton D. Baker, 1863-1941. Baltimore, MD: Johns Hopkins University Press, 2013.
 Cuff, Robert D. The War Industries Board: Business-Government Relations During World War I (Johns Hopkins University Press, 1973.)
 Palmer, Frederick. Newton D. Baker: America at War. 2 vols. New York: Dodd, Mead, 1931.
 Van Tassel, David D. and John J. Grabowski, eds., The Encyclopedia Of Cleveland History. Cleveland Bicentennial Commission.

Primary sources
 Baker, Newton D. Frontiers of freedom (1918) online
 Palmer, Frederick. Newton D. Baker: America at war, based on the personal papers of the secretary of war in the world war; his correspondence with the President and important leaders at home and aboard; the confidential cablegrams between the War department and headquarters in France; the minutes of the War industries board, and other first-hand material (Dodd, Meade & Company, 1931)

External links

 

 Adler, Jessica L.: Baker, Newton D., in: 1914-1918-online. International Encyclopedia of the First World War.

1871 births
1937 deaths
American Episcopalians
American people of World War I
Burials at Lake View Cemetery, Cleveland
Episcopal High School (Alexandria, Virginia) alumni
Mayors of Cleveland
Ohio Democrats
Ohio lawyers
Politicians from Martinsburg, West Virginia
Politicians from Shaker Heights, Ohio
Candidates in the 1924 United States presidential election
Candidates in the 1928 United States presidential election
Candidates in the 1932 United States presidential election
20th-century American politicians
United States Secretaries of War
Washington and Lee University School of Law alumni
Members of the Permanent Court of Arbitration
Johns Hopkins University alumni
Woodrow Wilson administration cabinet members
The Century Foundation
American judges of international courts and tribunals
People from Georgetown (Washington, D.C.)
Lawyers from Martinsburg, West Virginia
Georgist politicians
People associated with BakerHostetler